As Far as I Can Walk (also known as Strahinja Banović or Strahinja) is a 2021 internationally co-produced drama film directed by Stefan Arsenijević and written by Arsenijević, Bojan Vuletić and Nicolas Ducray. It is a modern reimagining of Strahinja Banović, a hero of medieval Serbian epic poetry, that follows a young Ghanaian couple living as refugees in Belgrade. It premiered at the 55th Karlovy Vary International Film Festival, where it won five awards.

Cast
 Ibrahim Koma as Strahinja, an aspiring footballer
 Nancy Mensah-Offei as Ababuo, an aspiring actress
 Maxim Khalil as Ali
 Rami Farah as Dervish

Production
The film was produced by Miroslav Mogorovich of Serbia's Art & Popcorn, Alice Ormieres of France's Surprise Valley, Gilles Chanial of Luxembourg's Les Films Fauves, Borislav Chouchkov of Bulgaria's Chouchkov Brothers, and Kestutis Drazdauskas of Lithuania's Artbox. The project received support from Eurimages, Film Center Serbia, the Serbian Film Incentive, Film Fund Luxembourg, the Bulgarian National Film Center, the Lithuanian Film Centre, the CNC's Aide aux cinémas du monde, and the European Union's Creative Europe MEDIA.

Principal photography took place on location in Belgrade in 2020.

Awards and nominations

Notes

References

External links
 

2020s English-language films
Films about immigration to Europe
Films about refugees
Films based on poems
Films based on Slavic mythology
Films set in Belgrade
Films shot in Belgrade
2020s French-language films
Serbian drama films
2020s Serbian-language films
2021 multilingual films
Cultural depictions of Serbian men
French drama films
Luxembourgian drama films
Bulgarian drama films
Lithuanian drama films
Crystal Globe winners
Serbian multilingual films
French multilingual films
Luxembourgian multilingual films
Bulgarian multilingual films
Lithuanian multilingual films
2020s French films